Evangeline is a 1919 American silent drama film produced and distributed by the Fox Film Corporation and directed by Raoul Walsh. The star of the film was Walsh's wife, who at the time was Miriam Cooper in the oft filmed story based on the 1847 poem of the same name by Henry Wadsworth Longfellow. The poem was filmed previously in 1908, 1911, and 1914.

Currently Evangeline is considered to be a lost film.

Plot
As described in a film magazine, Evangeline (Cooper) and Gabriel (Roscoe), young people of a small village, gain the consent of their parents and announce their wedding. On the morning of the wedding day, British soldiers land at the town and summon all the Acadians, who are of French descent, to the church where they read the King's order requiring their deportation. The marriage is thus prevented and the two lovers, during the deportation, lose sight of each other and end up in different localities. Released from surveillance, each sets out in search of the other. Their search continues until they are old when Gabriel, victim of a pestilence, is brought to an almshouse where Evangeline is a nurse to the afflicted. Here they are happy for a while until Gabriel's death occurs.

Cast

Miriam Cooper as Evangeline
Alan Roscoe as Gabriel
Spottiswoode Aitken as Benedict Bellefontaine
James A. Marcus as Basil
Paul Weigel as Father Felician
William A. Wellman as A British Lieutenant

See also
Expulsion of the Acadians

References

External links

Evangeline lobby poster

1919 films
American silent feature films
Films based on works by Henry Wadsworth Longfellow
Films directed by Raoul Walsh
Lost American films
Fox Film films
1919 drama films
Silent American drama films
American black-and-white films
1919 lost films
Lost drama films
1910s American films